Astyra is a genus of amphipods in the family Stilipedidae. It contains 6 species.

Species 
Species that were accepted by the WoRMS

 Astyra abyssi Boeck, 1871
 Astyra antarctica Andres, 1997
 Astyra bogorovi Birstein & M. Vinogradov, 1955
 Astyra gardineri Walker, 1909
 Astyra longipes Stephensen, 1933
 Astyra zenkevitchi Birstein & M. Vinogradov, 1955

References 

Gammaridea